Lake Region High School is a public high school and associated on-site vocational center located in Naples, Maine, United States, serving the towns of Bridgton, Casco, and Naples.  The school is part of Maine School Administrative District 61.

References

External links
School website

Public high schools in Maine
High schools in Cumberland County, Maine
Naples, Maine